The Federal Agency for Cartography and Geodesy (BKG) is Germany's national mapping agency.
It is located in Frankfurt, with a branch in Leipzig.
It operates the Geodetic Observatory Wettzell.

References
About BKG

External link

National mapping agencies
Cartography organizations
Geodesy organizations
German federal agencies
Geography of Germany